Inert gas asphyxiation is a form of asphyxiation which results from breathing a physiologically inert gas in the absence of oxygen, or a low amount of oxygen,<ref>European Industrial Gases Association (2009), Hazards of Inert Gases and Oxygen Depletion , IGC Doc 44/09/E</ref> rather than atmospheric air (which is composed largely of nitrogen and oxygen). Examples of physiologically inert gases, which have caused accidental or deliberate death by this mechanism, are argon, helium, nitrogen and methane. The term "physiologically inert" is used to indicate a gas which has no toxic or anesthetic properties and does not act upon the heart or hemoglobin. Instead, the gas acts as a simple diluent to reduce oxygen concentration in inspired gas and blood to dangerously low levels, thereby eventually depriving all cells in the body of oxygen.

According to the U.S. Chemical Safety and Hazard Investigation Board, in humans, "breathing an oxygen deficient atmosphere can have serious and immediate effects, including unconsciousness after only one or two breaths. The exposed person has no warning and cannot sense that the oxygen level is too low." In the US, at least 80 people died from accidental nitrogen asphyxiation between 1992 and 2002. Hazards with inert gases and the risks of asphyxiation are well established.

An occasional cause of accidental death in humans, inert gas asphyxia with gases including helium, nitrogen, methane and argon has been used as a suicide method. Inert gas asphyxia has been advocated by proponents of euthanasia, using a gas-retaining plastic hood device colloquially referred to as a suicide bag.

Nitrogen asphyxiation has been approved in some places as a method of capital punishment, but has not yet been used for this purpose.

 Process 
When humans breathe in an asphyxiant gas, such as pure nitrogen, helium, neon, argon, methane, or any other physiologically inert gas, they exhale carbon dioxide without re-supplying oxygen. Physiologically inert gases (those that have no toxic effect, but merely dilute oxygen) are generally free of odor and taste. Accordingly, the human subject detects little abnormal sensation as the oxygen level falls. This leads to asphyxiation (death from lack of oxygen) without the painful and traumatic feeling of suffocation (the hypercapnic alarm response, which in humans arises mostly from carbon dioxide levels rising), or the side effects of poisoning. In scuba diving rebreather accidents, there is often little sensation, however, a slow decrease in oxygen breathing gas content has effects which are quite variable. By contrast, suddenly breathing pure inert gas causes oxygen levels in the blood to fall precipitously, and may lead to unconsciousness in only a few breaths, with no symptoms at all.

Some animal species are better equipped than humans to detect hypoxia, and these species are more uncomfortable in low-oxygen environments that result from inert gas exposure; however, the experience is still less aversive than CO2 exposure.

 Physiology 

A typical human breathes between 12 and 20 times per minute at a rate influenced primarily by carbon dioxide concentration, and thus pH, in the blood. With each breath, a volume of about 0.6 litres is exchanged from an active lung volume of about three litres. The normal composition of the Earth's atmosphere is about 78% nitrogen, 21% oxygen, and 1% argon, carbon dioxide, and other gases. After just two or three breaths of nitrogen, the oxygen concentration in the lungs would be low enough for some oxygen already in the bloodstream to exchange back to the lungs and be eliminated by exhalation.

Unconsciousness in cases of accidental asphyxia can occur within one minute. Loss of consciousness results from critical hypoxia, when arterial oxygen saturation is less than 60%. "At oxygen concentrations [in air] of 4 to 6%, there is loss of consciousness in 40 seconds and death within a few minutes". The US Air Force trains air crews to recognize their individual subjective signs of approaching hypoxia. Some individuals experience headache, dizziness, fatigue, nausea and euphoria, and some become unconscious without warning.

Loss of consciousness may be accompanied by convulsions and is followed by cyanosis and cardiac arrest. About seven minutes of oxygen deprivation causes death of the brainstem.

In a 1963 study by RAF Institute of Aviation Medicine, subjects were asked to hyperventilate in a nitrogen atmosphere. Among the results:

The study did not report how much discomfort the subjects felt.

 Animal slaughter 

 Relation to controlled atmosphere killing Controlled atmosphere killing (CAK) or controlled atmosphere stunning (CAS) is a method for slaughtering or stunning animals such as swine, poultry, or cane toads by placing the animals in a container in which the atmosphere lacks oxygen and consists of an asphyxiant gas (one or more of argon, nitrogen or carbon dioxide), causing the animals to lose consciousness. Argon and nitrogen are important components of a gassing process which seem to cause no pain, and for this reason many consider some types of controlled atmosphere killing more humane than other methods of killing. However, "stunning" is most often done using carbon dioxide. If carbon dioxide is used, controlled atmosphere killing is not the same as inert gas asphyxia, because carbon dioxide at high concentrations (above 5%) is not biologically inert, but rather is toxic and also produces initial distress in some animal species. The addition of toxic carbon dioxide to hypoxic atmospheres used in slaughter without animal distress is a complex and highly species-specific matter, which also depends on  concentration of carbon dioxide.

 Euthanasia of animals 
Diving animals such as rats and minks and burrowing animals are sensitive to low-oxygen atmospheres and (unlike humans) will avoid them, making purely hypoxic techniques possibly inhumane for them. For this reason, the use of inert gas (hypoxic) atmospheres (without CO2) for euthanasia is also species-specific.

 Accidental deaths and injury 

Accidental nitrogen asphyxiation is a possible hazard where large quantities of nitrogen are used. It causes several deaths per year in the United States, which is asserted to be more than from any other industrial gas. In one accident in 1981, shortly before the launch of the first Space Shuttle mission, five technicians lost consciousness and two of them died after they entered the Orbiter aft compartment.  Nitrogen had been used to flush oxygen from the compartment as a precaution against fire. They were not wearing air packs because of a last-minute change in safety procedures.

During a pool party in Mexico in 2013, eight party-goers were rendered unconscious and one 21-year-old male was put into a coma after liquid nitrogen was poured into the pool.

Occasional deaths are reported from recreational inhalation of helium, but these are very rare from direct inhalation from small balloons. The inhalation from larger helium balloons has been reportedly fatal.  A fatal fall from a tree occurred after the inhalation of helium from a toy balloon, which caused the person to become either unconscious or lightheaded.

In 2015, a technician at a health spa was asphyxiated while conducting unsupervised cryotherapy using nitrogen.

In 2021, six people died of asphyxiation and 11 more were hospitalized following a liquid nitrogen leak at a poultry plant in Gainesville, Georgia.

 Suicide 

Use of inert gas for suicide was first proposed by a Canadian, Dr Bruce Dunn. Dunn commented that "...the acquisition of a compressed gas cylinder, an appropriate pressure reducing regulator, and suitable administration equipment... [was] not inaccessible to a determined individual, but relatively difficult for a member of the public to acquire casually or quickly." Dunn collaborated with other researchers, notably the Canadian campaigner, John Hofsess, who in 1997 formed the group "NuTech" with Derek Humphry and Philip Nitschke. Two years later, NuTech had streamlined Dunn's work by using readily-available party balloon cylinders of helium.

The method of suicide based on self-administration of helium in a bag, a colloquial name being the "exit bag" or suicide bag, has been referenced by some medical euthanasia advocacy groups. Originally such bags were used with helium, and 30 deaths were reported with use of them from 2001 to 2005, and another 79 from 2005 to 2009. This suggested to one set of reviewers that the popularity of the technique was increasing, as also did the increase in helium suicides in Sweden during the latter half of the same decade.

After attempts were made by authorities to control helium sales in Australia, a new method was introduced that instead uses nitrogen. Nitrogen became the main gas promoted by euthanasia advocates, such as Philip Nitschke, who founded a company called Max Dog Brewing in order to import canisters of nitrogen into Australia. Nitschke stated that the gas cylinders can be used for both brewing and, if required, to end life at a later stage in a "peaceful, reliable [and] totally legal" manner. Nitschke said that nitrogen is "undetectable even by autopsy, which was important to some people".

Nitschke produced a 3D printed pod, "Sarco", that fills with nitrogen at the push of a button, claiming to cause its user to become unconscious within a minute and then die of oxygen deprivation.

 Capital punishment 

Execution by nitrogen asphyxiation was discussed briefly in print as a theoretical method of capital punishment in a 1995 National Review article. The idea was then proposed by Lawrence J. Gist II, an attorney at law, under the title, International Humanitarian Hypoxia Project.

In a televised documentary in 2007, the British political commentator and former MP Michael Portillo examined execution techniques in use around the world and found them unsatisfactory; his conclusion was that nitrogen asphyxiation would be the best method.

In April 2015, Governor Mary Fallin of Oklahoma signed a bill allowing nitrogen asphyxiation as an alternative execution method.  Three years later, in March 2018, Oklahoma announced that, due to the difficulty in procuring lethal injection drugs, nitrogen gas will be used to carry out executions. After making "good progress" in designing a nitrogen execution protocol, but not actually carrying out any executions, Oklahoma announced in February 2020 it had found a new reliable source of lethal injection drugs, but would continue working on nitrogen execution as a contingency method.

In March 2018, Alabama became the third state (after Oklahoma and Mississippi), to authorize the use of nitrogen asphyxiation as a method of execution.

In the case Bucklew v. Precythe'', decided 1 April 2019, the U.S. Supreme Court ruled that a Missouri death row inmate could not avoid death by lethal injection and choose inert gas asphyxiation using nitrogen, since it has never been used in any execution in the world.

See also

Notes

External links 
 NIOSH respirator fact sheet
 U.S. Chemical Safety and Hazard Investigation Board
 Restraint asphyxia
 The Welfare of Birds at Slaughter: Humane Society of the United States comparison of controlled-atmosphere killing (CAK) to electrical water-bath stunning
 Controlled Atmosphere Killing: People for the Ethical Treatment of Animals
 Nitrogen Induced Hypoxia as a Form of Capital Punishment, by Michael P. Copeland, J.D., Thom Parr, M.S., and Christine Pappas, J.D., Ph.D.
 Execution by Nitrogen Hypoxia: Search for Scientific Consensus, by Kevin M. Morrow, J.D.

Animal welfare
Causes of death
Execution methods
Meat industry
Nitrogen
Poultry farming
Slaughter methods
Toxicology
Asphyxia